Le V ('The V') is a hotel and apartment complex in Montreal, Quebec, Canada. It is located on René Lévesque Boulevard West between Bleury Street and Anderson Street in Downtown Montreal.

The hotel has 212 rooms and is located on the first twelve floors. It is branded as a Courtyard by Marriott hotel, known as the Courtyard Marriott Montreal Centre-ville.

The apartment section consists of 240 rental apartments and is located on the upper twenty-eight floors. It is branded as Le V.

Construction began in 2011. The Courtyard by Marriott hotel officially opened in September 2013, while the apartments section was completed in 2014.

References

External links
Official website
Official website - Courtyard Marriott Montreal Centre-ville Hotel
Furnished apartments in The V- 388 Boulevard René-Lévesque Ouest

Skyscrapers in Montreal
Downtown Montreal
Apartment buildings in Quebec
Residential skyscrapers in Canada
Courtyard by Marriott hotels
Hotels in Montreal
Residential buildings in Montreal